Anthony Ray Jones (born July 10, 1948) is a retired United States Army lieutenant general who served as acting commander of the United States Army Training and Doctrine Command.

Early life
A native of Washington, Indiana, Jones graduated from Indiana University in June 1970 and was a Reserve Officer Training Corps Distinguished Military Graduate.

Military career
Commissioned a second lieutenant of Infantry, Jones later became qualified in the Aviation branch. His early assignments included: Task Force Executive Officer and Company Commander, 160th Aviation Group (Airborne), 1st Special Operations Command; Commander, 3rd Battalion, 227th Aviation Regiment, 3rd Armored Division; Commander, Combat Aviation Brigade, 24th Infantry Division; Chief of Staff, 24th Infantry Division (Mechanized); and Deputy Director for Operations, National Military Command Center, J-3, The Joint Staff. Jones's overseas experience included Operation Desert Shield and Operation Desert Storm in Saudi Arabia, as well as Operation Joint Guard in Bosnia.

Jones's later assignments included: Assistant Division Commander (Forward), 1st Armored Division; Commanding General, United States Army Aviation Center and Fort Rucker; and Chief of Staff, United States Army Europe and Seventh Army.

Jones's final assignment was as Deputy Commander of United States Army Training and Doctrine Command. In 2004 Jones co-led an inquiry into alleged detainee abuse in Iraq by members of United States military intelligence. He served as acting TRADOC commander after General Kevin P. Byrnes was relieved of duty in 2005.

Education
Jones graduated from the Infantry Officer Basic and Advanced Courses, the United States Army Command and General Staff College, and the United States Army War College. He holds a master's degree in Systems Management from the University of Southern California.

Post-military career
After leaving the army, Jones worked as Vice President of Training Systems and Services for the Boeing Company.

In 2011 Jones was inducted into the Army Aviation Hall of Fame.

Awards and decorations
Jones's awards and decorations include the following:

References

1948 births
United States Army Infantry Branch personnel
Living people
People from Washington, Indiana
Indiana University alumni
Park University alumni
Military personnel from Indiana
American Master Army Aviators
United States Army personnel of the Iraq War
Recipients of the Air Medal
University of Southern California alumni
United States Army War College alumni
United States Army Command and General Staff College alumni
Recipients of the Legion of Merit
United States Army generals
Recipients of the Defense Superior Service Medal
Recipients of the Distinguished Service Medal (US Army)